Karen Malina White is an American film and television actress. She is best known for her roles as Kaneesha Carter in the 1989 drama film Lean on Me, Charmaine Brown during the two final seasons on The Cosby Show (1990–1992) and its spin-off A Different World (1992–1993), Nicolette Vandross on Malcolm & Eddie (1996–2000), and as the voice of Dijonay Jones on the Disney Channel animated comedy The Proud Family (2001–2005) and its 2022 Disney+ reboot The Proud Family: Louder and Prouder.

Biography 
White was born and raised in Philadelphia, Pennsylvania. White studied at the Philadelphia High School for Creative and Performing Arts. After graduating high school, White continued her studies at Howard University, where she graduated cum laude with a Bachelor of Fine Arts Degree. During her senior year, White won the title of "Miss Howard University" and landed her first role as an actress.

In 1989, White starred in Lean on Me alongside actor Morgan Freeman. She was nominated for the 1990 Young Artist Award for Best Young Actress Supporting Role in a Motion Picture for her performance in the film. During the 1990s, White made many guest appearances in various television shows. White portrayed Charmaine Brown during Seasons 7 and 8 of The Cosby Show (1990–1992), and Season 6 of A Different World (1992–1993). White also guest starred as Jewel, Jazz's wife in two episodes of The Fresh Prince of Bel-Air. From 2001 to 2005, she performed the voice of Dijonay Jones on the animated Disney Channel series The Proud Family.

Personal life 
White has never married and has no children. From 1997 until 2005, White dated actor Malcolm-Jamal Warner. Contrary to rumors, White was never married nor engaged to Warner. Warner stated in 2009, "I'm not married. People probably started saying that because we were in a relationship for seven and a half years."

Filmography

Film and TV Movies

Television

References

External links 

Howard University alumni
Living people
Actresses from Philadelphia
American film actresses
American television actresses
American voice actresses
African-American actresses
Philadelphia High School for the Creative and Performing Arts alumni
21st-century African-American people
21st-century African-American women
20th-century African-American people
20th-century African-American women
Year of birth missing (living people)